The Fernmeldeturm Mannheim is a  concrete telecommunication tower with an observation deck in Mannheim, Germany. It was designed by the architects Heinle, Wischer und Partner and built from 1973 and 1975. It contains transmission facilities for UHR radio services, microwave communications, and omnidirectional radio services. A glassed observation deck and a revolving restaurant at a height of 120 metres allow a nice view over Mannheim and the surrounding area. The tower is a modern landmark of the city of Mannheim.

In December 1994 a German SAR Army helicopter returning from a medical patient transfer mission collided with the top of the tower and fell to the ground. The crew of four people died instantly. Parts of the top of the tower were disconnected and also fell to the ground.

See also
List of Towers

Notes

External links

 

Towers completed in 1975
Observation towers in Baden-Württemberg
Towers with revolving restaurants
Communication towers in Germany
Buildings and structures in Mannheim
Tourist attractions in Mannheim
1975 establishments in West Germany